Michael Lorenzo Romero (born January 12, 2004) is an American professional baseball shortstop in the Boston Red Sox organization.

Amateur career
Romero attended Orange Lutheran High School in Orange, California. He played for the United States in the gold medal game of the U-12 Baseball World Cup in 2016 and in qualifying round of the U-15 Baseball World Cup in 2019.  As a high school junior in 2021, he had a .362 batting average. That summer, he played in the Perfect Game All-American Classic at Petco Park. Romero originally committed to play college baseball for the Arizona Wildcats, but flipped his commitment to the LSU Tigers after coach Jay Johnson left Arizona for LSU. He entered his senior year of high school in 2022 as a top prospect for the upcoming draft. He finished the season with a .372 batting average.

Professional career
Romero was drafted in the first round with the 24th overall selection by the Boston Red Sox in the 2022 Major League Baseball draft. He signed with the team on July 25, for $2.3 million.

Romero made his professional debut with the Rookie-level Florida Complex League Red Sox. He was later promoted to the Salem Red Sox of the Low-A Carolina League. Over 19 games between the two teams, he batted .304 with one home run and 17 RBIs.

Personal life
Romero's sisters Sierra and Sydney are both professional softball players.

References

External links

2004 births
Living people
Baseball players from California
Baseball shortstops
Florida Complex League Red Sox players